Ngamprah is a kecamatan (district) in central Parahyangan region of Java, which serves as the regency seat of West Bandung Regency in West Java, Indonesia. Ngamprah has postal code 40552 that applies to all 11 villages located in Ngamprah.

Administrative divisions
The district encompasses eleven administrative villages (kelurahan and desa):

 Bojongkoneng
 Cilame
 Cimanggu
 Cimareme
 Gadobangkong
 Margajaya
 Mekarsari
 Ngamprah
 Pakuhaji
 Sukatani
 Tanimulya

Climate
Ngamprah has an elevation moderated tropical rainforest climate (Af) with moderate rainfall from June to September and heavy rainfall from October to May.

References

External links 
 Kode Pos Ngamprah 

Regency seats of West Java
West Bandung Regency